Breakfast Serials is a twenty-five-minute anthology series for children that aired on BBC1 for one series in 1990.

Format
The series comprised various shorts that were based on a variety of genres such as dialogue comedy (Cheapo TV), drama (Runners and NiceChap), stand-up comedy (Zounds) and narrative (Single Tales).

Each serial would be prefaced by a conversation between a puppet Teapot, a Tin can, and a Tomato (known as The Kitchen Crew). On occasion, they would interact with the serial characters. The final discussion of the overall episode would lead into a song performed by all three that would play over the end credits.

All voices and acting roles/guises in the series were performed by Caroline Berry, John Biggins, Lucy Jenkins and William Petrie.

Nice Chap
One segment of the show was Nice Chap, an adventure/drama about a cartoon strip character that is brought to life. The serial comprised three "series", each connected in continuity, but could also be viewed as stand-alone storylines

Nice Chap: "Nice Chap", a permanently positive, curious man-child who speaks in rhyme, is the creation of a depressed and lonesome female illustrator (Suzie, creator of Cozicomix). Suzie's only friends are plants, one of which is a yucca named Peter. Nice Chap is brought to life when a bolt of lightning strikes Suzie's drawing board. The two are placed in mortal danger by a rival comics company (Megacomix), managed by Joyce (nicknamed "Clench") and Norris and manned by a megalomaniacal supercomputer (It) and at least one other computer (Chuck). Clench and Norris become friends with Suzie at the end.

Nice Chap 2: Six months later the Supercomputer takes control of Norris and lays siege to a television station which is known as 'Norris Vision'. Nice Chap and Suzie foil its plans and all returns to normal.

Nice Chap 3: Another six months later on the anniversary of his first coming to life Nice Chap himself is turned evil when his creator, in a fit of anger, draws dark eyebrows on him. At the serial's conclusion, The renegade Nice Chap is killed by a doppelganger and his creator gives in to her despair, using a device called a Crash Machine to send herself into Nice Chap's dimension to be with a positive version of him forever.

Critical reaction
TV Cream was critical, calling Cheapo TV "unfunny TV parodies" and Zounds "terrible drama school style surrealism", and criticising other strands for boredom or lack of originality.

References

External links
 https://www.imdb.com/title/tt0396292/fullcredits#cast

BBC children's television shows
British children's television series
British television shows featuring puppetry
1990 British television series debuts
1990 British television series endings
1990s British children's television series
English-language television shows